Matthew or Matt Barnes is also the name of:

 Matt Barnes (baseball) (born 1990), American baseball pitcher
 Matt Barnes (basketball)''' (born 1980) is an American basketball player.
 Matt Barnes (coach) (born 1986), American football coach
 Matt Barnes (ice hockey) (born 1974), Canadian ice hockey goaltender
 Matt Barnes (soccer) (born 1972), American soccer coach
 Matt Barnes, member of the British rock band You Me at Six
 Matthew Barnes (born 1973), British businessman

See also
 Matthew Barnes-Homer (born 1986), English footballer